Petr Zelenka (born 21 August 1967 in Prague, Czechoslovakia) is a Czech playwright and director of theatre and film. His films have been recognized at international festivals in Moscow and Rotterdam. In 2008, his film Karamazovi was the Czech Republic's official Oscar submission for Best Foreign Language Film.

Career
An early notable work is a black comedy, Tales of Common Insanity (2004), which he directed at Dejvické divadlo. He received the Alfréd Radok Award for Best Play. The play was later staged in other Czech theatres as well as in Poland, Hungary, Slovakia, Slovenia and Germany. It was also published in English and translated to Russian. 
For his film Mnâga – Happy End  he won the 1996 Findling Award at the Filmfestival Cottbus.

In 2005 Zelenka adapted the comedy as a film, released as Wrong Side Up, which won two movie festival awards in 2006 and was nominated for six other awards. His second most notable play is Teremin, inspired by the life of Russian inventor Léon Theremin.

His 2008 film, Karamazovi, was the Czech Republic's official Oscar submission for Best Foreign Language Film.

His 2010 election advertisement "Přemluv bábu a dědu" caused controversy as critics believed it was offensive against elder people and "an imperfect copy of Sarah Silverman's stand-up video."

Filmography

References

External links
Short bio plus info about Tales of Common Insanity at divadlo.cz (in English)

 
20th-century Czech dramatists and playwrights
Czech male dramatists and playwrights
Czech theatre directors
1967 births
Living people
Film directors from Prague
Writers from Prague